Michael Patrick Ryan (September 29, 1825 – January 18, 1893) was an Irish-born Quebec businessman and political figure. He represented Montreal West in the 1st Canadian Parliament and Montreal Centre in the House of Commons of Canada from 1872 to 1874 and from 1879 to 1882 as a Liberal-Conservative member.

He was born in Pallis, Donohill, County Tipperary in Ireland in 1825, the son of William Ryan, and came to Lower Canada with his family in 1840, settling near Chambly. He became a merchant in Montreal. In 1850, he married Margaret Brennan. He was elected to the city council in 1852 and served as captain in the local militia. Ryan also was a member of the Council of the Board of Trade in Montreal and a director for the Montreal, Ottawa and Occidental Railway.

Following the assassination of Liberal-Conservative Member of Parliament Thomas D'Arcy McGee in April 1868, Ryan was selected by the party to run in the ensuing by-election. Due to the circumstances of the by-election Ryan's candidacy was unopposed and he was elected to the House of Commons by acclamation.

Ryan retired from business in 1875. In 1882, he was named customs collector at Montreal and served in that post until his death in January 1893.

By-election: On election being declared void, 31 October 1874

References 

1825 births
1893 deaths
Conservative Party of Canada (1867–1942) MPs
Members of the House of Commons of Canada from Quebec
Irish emigrants to pre-Confederation Quebec
Immigrants to Lower Canada